Hugo Ilmari Solin (19 September 1905 – 20 June 1976) was a Finnish chess player, Finnish Chess Championship winner (1945).

Biography
Hugo Ilmari Solin was born in a Finnish family living in Revel (at that time - the territory of the Russian Empire). He lived in Estonia, and in 1925 he moved to Finland to undergo urgent military service. He stayed in Finland for permanent residence. From the end the 1930s to begin the 1950 Solin was one of Finland's leading chess players. In 1945, in Helsinki he won Finnish Chess Championship. Also he twice shared 2nd place in Finnish Chess Championships: in 1946 and in 1954. In 1954, in Prague Solin participated in FIDE Zonal tournament where he ranked in 19th place.

Solin played for Finland in the Chess Olympiads:
 In 1935, at third board in the 6th Chess Olympiad in Warsaw (+7, =3, -7),
 In 1937, at third board in the 7th Chess Olympiad in Stockholm (+2, =2, -7).

Solin played for Finland in the unofficial Chess Olympiad:
 In 1936, at third board in the 3rd unofficial Chess Olympiad in Munich (+5, =9, -5).

References

External links

Ilmari Solin chess games at 365chess.com

1905 births
1976 deaths
Sportspeople from Tallinn
Finnish chess players
Chess Olympiad competitors
20th-century chess players
Finnish expatriates in Estonia